, born Ueda Kisaburō 上田 喜三郎 (1871–1948), is considered one of the two spiritual leaders of the Ōmoto religious movement in Japan.

History
Onisaburo had studied Honda Chikaatsu's "Spirit Studies" (Honda Reigaku), he also learned to mediate spirit possession (chinkon kishin) from Honda's disciple Nagasawa Katsutate in Shizuoka. He met the founder of Omotokyo in 1898 and in 1899 they established the Kinmeikai,  later called Kinmei Reigakkai. In 1900 Kisaburō married Nao's fifth daughter Sumi and adopted the name Deguchi Onisaburō. Oomoto teaches that the guardian spirit of Nao is Amaterasu, described as a male spirit in a female body, and Onisaburo's spirit is Susanowo, a female spirit in a male body.

In 1908 he and Deguchi Nao founded the Dai Nihon Shūseikai which in 1913 became Taihonkyō and in 1916 the Kōdō Ōmoto.  In 1923, he learned Esperanto, an international planned language, and introduced it to the activities of Oomoto. In 1924, retired naval captain Yutaro Yano and his associates within the Black Dragon Society invited Onisaburo on a journey to Mongolia. Onisaburo led a group of Oomoto disciples, including Aikido founder Morihei Ueshiba. Ikki Kita had previously been sent to China by the Black Dragon Society and had in 1919 proposed that Esperanto be the only language spoken in the Empire of Japan.

In Ōmoto Incident, he had been detained for about six years and a half since his arrest in 1935.

He is remembered as a jovial patriarch of that school and is best known to Westerners as a teacher and religious instructor of Morihei Ueshiba, the founder of aikido. 

A believer in the Oomoto maxim that it was humanity's duty to move forward together, bringing about a new age of existence on Earth, Onisaburo went to great lengths to promote the syncretic faith preached by Nao Deguchi. He wrote the Reikai Monogatari (Tales of the Spirit World), an 81-volume work that covered his alleged travels into the spiritual planes of existence, as well as many other theologically permeated stories which expounded on numerous Oomoto spiritual ideals.

Throughout his life, Onisaburo was often quite flamboyant, taking delight in wearing richly textured costumes of his own design and posing as a wide variety of deities, mostly Buddhist or Shinto. He would also dress like a shaman, and often even took up the appearances of female divinities. His outlook on life tended to be eclectic, sometimes even to the point of being outrageous. At varying points of his lifetime, he claimed to be an incarnation of Miroku Butsu (Sanskrit: Maitreya Buddha), and often referred to himself as a remodeler of the world.

Like most Oomoto followers, Onisaburo believed that the original kami founders of Japan, were driven away by the kami of the imperial line. This placed him in opposition to the authorities at the time, though he had the ability to hide it. This again differentiated him from Nao Deguchi, who was more open and direct in her proclamations. Onisaburo was quite talented in quieting the government officials while at the same time subverting their efforts that he found distasteful or amoral. 

Onisaburo's legacy is largely concerned with art, including a wealth of calligraphic and poetic works. He also dabbled in cinema, sculpture, and pottery, leaving behind thousands of items that are now considered by many enthusiasts to be of great value.

References

Further reading
Nancy K. Stalker, "Prophet Motive:  Deguchi Onisaburo, Oomoto and the Rise of New Religion in Imperial Japan," University Of Hawaii, 2008, 
 Emily Groszos Ooms, Women and Millenarian Protest in Meiji Japan: Deguchi Nao and Omotokyo, Cornell Univ East Asia Program, 1993, 
The Great Onisaburo Deguchi, by Kyotaro Deguchi, translated by Charles Rowe, 
 Murakami Shigeyoshi. Japanese Religion in the Modern Century. Translated by H. Byron Earhart. Tokyo, 1980. Originally published as Kindai hyakunen no shukyo.

External links 

 The Moon of Onisaburo Deguchi
 Reading "The Great Onisaburo Deguchi" by Ruth Reiser

Deguchi, Onisburo
Deguchi, Onisburo
Deguchi, Onisburo
Deguchi, Onisburo
Founders of new religious movements
Oomoto
Japanese Esperantists